= Guðmundur E. Stephensen =

Guðmundur Stephensen
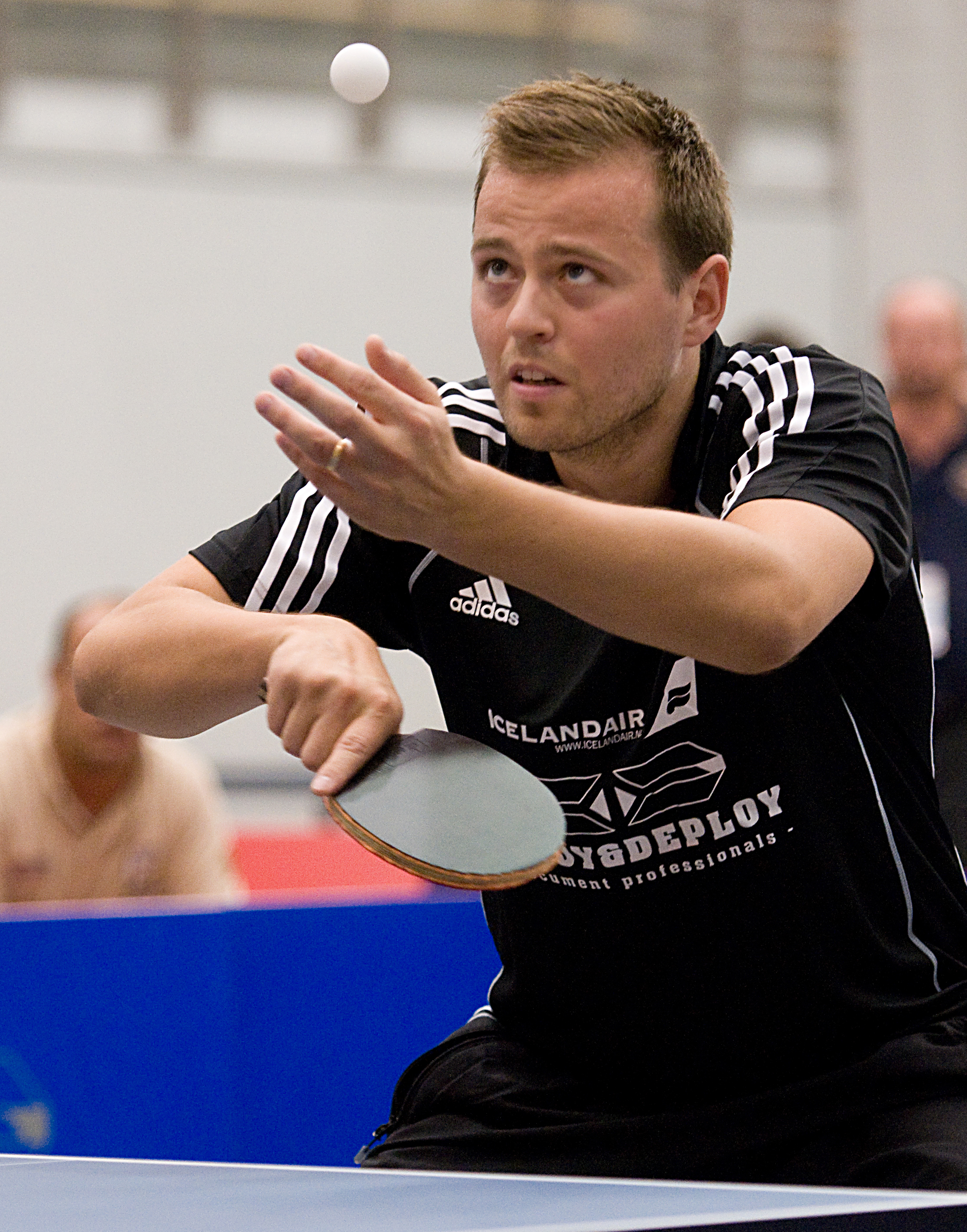
- Guðmundur in 2011

Personal information
- Full name: Guðmundur Eggert Stephensen
- Nationality: Icelandic
- Born: June 29, 1982 (age 44)

Sport
- Sport: Table tennis

Guðmundur Eggert Stephensen (born 29 June 1982) is an Icelandic table tennis player. He won his first Icelandic men's singles championship in 1994, then only 11 years old. He went on to win the men's singles national championship for 20-years in a row until retiring in 2013.

He resumed his career in 2023 and won his 21st men's singles national championship on 6 March 2023.
